In a general sense, an alternative set theory is any of the alternative mathematical approaches to the concept of set and any alternative to the de facto standard set theory described in axiomatic set theory by the axioms of Zermelo–Fraenkel set theory. More specifically, Alternative Set Theory (or AST) may refer to a particular set theory developed in the 1970s and 1980s by Petr Vopěnka and his students.

Vopěnka's Alternative Set Theory 

Vopěnka's Alternative Set Theory builds on some ideas of the theory of semisets, but also introduces more radical changes: for example, all sets are "formally" finite, which means that sets in AST satisfy the law of mathematical induction for set-formulas (more precisely: the part of AST that consists of axioms related to sets only is equivalent to the Zermelo–Fraenkel (or ZF) set theory, in which the axiom of infinity is replaced by its negation). However, some of these sets contain subclasses that are not sets, which makes them different from Cantor (ZF) finite sets and they are called infinite in AST.

Other alternative set theories 

Other alternative set theories include:

Von Neumann–Bernays–Gödel set theory
Morse–Kelley set theory
Tarski–Grothendieck set theory
Ackermann set theory
Type theory
New Foundations
Positive set theory
Internal set theory
Naive set theory
S (set theory)
Kripke–Platek set theory
Scott–Potter set theory
Constructive set theory
Zermelo set theory
General set theory

See also
 Non-well-founded set theory

Notes

References

Proceedings of the 1st Symposium Mathematics in the Alternative Set Theory. JSMF, Bratislava, 1989.



Systems of set theory